Christus is a public artwork by an unknown artist located in Oaklawn Memorial Gardens in Indianapolis, Indiana in the United States.

Description

Built around 1960, it depicts Jesus Christ standing and wearing a robe and mantle. His head is bowed slightly and his eyes are closed. His arms are stretched in front of him with the palms of his hands facing upwards towards the sky. It stands upon a base made of brick and stone.

Condition

The piece was surveyed in 1993 by Save Outdoor Sculpture!. It was described as being "well maintained."

See also
 List of statues of Jesus

References

External links

Outdoor sculptures in Indianapolis
1960 sculptures
Statues of Jesus
Marble sculptures in Indiana
1960 establishments in Indiana
Statues in Indianapolis
Sculptures of men in Indiana
Works of unknown authorship